Grevillea acanthifolia, commonly known as the Acanthus-leaved grevillea, is a plant in the family Proteaceae and is endemic to New South Wales. It is a shrub with stiff, prickly, divided leaves and pink to purple "toothbrush" flowers.

Description
The leaves are bright green, stiff and prickly.

The small sepals and petals are pale green to grey and hairy on the outside and glabrous inside. Flowering occurs throughout the year but mainly from October to February and the fruit that follows is a hairy follicle with reddish markings.

Taxonomy and naming
Grevillea acanthifolia was first formally described in 1825 by Allan Cunningham from a specimen he collected on John Oxley's 1817 expedition. Cunningham found the species growing in "peaty bogs on the Blue Mountains and [on the] banks of Cox's River". The specific epithet (acanthifolia) is a derived from the name of the genus Acanthus and the Latin word folium meaning "a leaf" referring to the similarity of the leaves of this species to those of Acanthus.

The names of three subspecies are accepted by the Australian Plant Census:
Grevillea acanthifolia A.Cunn. subsp. acanthifolia which has its leaf lobes egg-shaped or wedge-shaped, not linear and which grows in swampy places or on wet rocks in the Blue Mountains;
Grevillea acanthifolia subsp. stenomera  (F.Muell. ex Benth.)

Grevillea × gaudichaudii is a hybrid derived from G. acanthifolia and Grevillea laurifolia.

Distribution and habitat
This grevillea only grows in New South Wales, usually at higher altitudes and in wet or boggy areas.

Conservation
Subspecies stenomera is classified in the ROTAP system as 3RC- meaning that it has a wide range but small populations and is rare, but at least some populations are in reserves and the species not at present under threat. Subspecies paludosa is classified as "Endangered" under the NSW Threatened Species Conservation Act and under the Commonwealth Government Environment Protection and Biodiversity Conservation Act 1999 (EPBC) Act. The main threats to its survival are habitat loss, changes to river flow regimes and trampling and grazing by stray domestic animals.

Use in horticulture
Subspecies acanthifolia of this grevillea is grown in some gardens but is sometimes unreliable at low altitudes. It grows best in a sunny position and is tolerant of heavy frosts.

References

acanthifolia
Flora of New South Wales
Proteales of Australia
Plants described in 1825